Trinity Christian School is a private, K-12, non-denominational Christian school centrally located in Fairfax County, Virginia, serving all of Northern Virginia.

Brief history

In 1987 the vestry of Truro voted unanimously to found Trinity Christian School, with Dr. J.C. Lasmanis named as its first headmaster. Trinity opened its doors to a total of forty-one students from first through third grade, each taught by three faculty members in classrooms provided by Truro.

In 1990 Dr. Jim Beavers took over the reins as headmaster. During Mr. Beavers' time in office: a 4th and 5th grade was added, a middle and upper school was established, enrollment greatly increased, and the faculty grew.  Eventually the school spread to encompass four different campuses in and throughout Fairfax county.

In 2001 Trinity named a new headmaster, Dr. Todd Williams, and graduated its first senior class. By this time fifty faculty members served over four hundred students on Trinity's four campuses. Although there had been many advantages for the school due to its rapid growth, unity between the different campuses was becoming a problem. Shortly after taking office, Dr. Williams made it a top priority to unite all the students onto one main campus. After two years of hard fundraising Trinity proudly opened the doors to its new 25-acre campus facility, located in Fairfax off of Braddock Road next to George Mason University. The new building included a state-of-the-art computer lab, two custom-made art rooms, a practice gymnasium, and a science lab.  All classes were moved to the new campus.

In 2005 Dr. Williams resigned as Trinity's headmaster to accept the vice presidency of Cairn University (then Philadelphia Biblical University). After much deliberation, the Trinity Christian board of trustees appointed then-teacher Dr. David Vanderpoel as the school's fourth headmaster. Since taking office, Dr. Vanderpoel has overseen the construction of a second building complete with a gymnasium [stadium seating for 900 and a large stage], a new weight room, a performing arts wing, two science labs, a kindergarten, and upgraded to turf fields.

In 2012, Trinity Christian School was awarded accreditation by the Southern Association of Colleges and Schools Council on Accreditation and School Improvement (SACS-CASI), the accreditation division of AdvancED.

In 2019, Trinity Christian School was designated a National Blue Ribbon School by the National Blue Ribbon Schools Program, 1 of only 362 schools to receive this throughout the nation.

In 2019, Trinity Christian School purchased a 29-acre piece of land a mile away on Shirley Gate Road. They plan to use this new land to build athletic fields and parking.

Trinity Christian School claims an enrollment of over 690 students in grades K through twelve, 97 faculty members  (over 60% holding advanced degrees), and 92,000 sq/ft of buildings (totaling $30 million) on a 25-acre campus.

Athletic teams

TCS Memberships

AdvancED TCS is accredited by the Southern Association of Colleges and Schools Council on Accreditation and School Improvement (SACS-CASI), an accreditation division of AdvancED.
ACSI - Association of Christian Schools International 
ECFA - Evangelical Council for Financial Accountability
VCAC - Virginia Christian Athletic Conference
VCPE - Virginia Council for Private Education
FCCC - Fairfax County Chamber of Commerce

References 

 Trinity Christian School, Fairfax, VA.  http://www.tcsfairfax.org/

External links 
 School homepage

Christian schools in Virginia
Private K-12 schools in Virginia
Educational institutions established in 1987
Fairfax, Virginia
Schools in Fairfax County, Virginia
1987 establishments in Virginia